Byrds Creek is an unincorporated community in the town of Richwood, Richland County, Wisconsin, United States.

History
The community was named for Adam Byrd, who built the first sawmill in the township. The post office was originally established as Bird's Creek in March 1890 and was changed to Byrd's Creek two months later.

Notes

Unincorporated communities in Richland County, Wisconsin
Unincorporated communities in Wisconsin